Liotia cancellata is a species of small sea snail, a marine gastropod mollusk in the family Liotiidae.

Description
The size of the shell varies between 2.5 mm and 4 mm. The thick, solid shell has a turbinate shape. The spire is relatively elevated. The convex whorls are regularly latticed with equidistant spiral and longitudinal ribs. The umbilicus has a moderate size and is defined by a spiral rib. The outer lip is simple.

Distribution
This species occurs in the Pacific Ocean off Northern Chile and Peru.

References

External links
 World Register of Marine Species
 

cancellata
Gastropods described in 1828